Gregory P. Gibson (born November 20, 1953) is a retired American wrestler who competed in the heavyweight division (under 100 kg.) He is the only American to win world medals in three styles of wrestling — Freestyle, Greco-Roman and Sambo. While serving with the U.S. Marines, stationed at Quantico, Va., he won a silver medal at the 1984 Summer Olympics in Greco-Roman, as well as two silver and a bronze medal in freestyle at the world championships from 1981 to 1983.

Background
Gibson graduated from Shasta High School in Redding, California in 1972. He went on to wrestle at the University of Oregon where he became a two-time NCAA All-American. Gibson joined the United States Marine Corps in 1978 and retired as a Master Sergeant in 2003.

In 2007, Gibson was inducted into the National Wrestling Hall of Fame as a Distinguished Member.

References

External links
Gregory P. Gibson profile at the United World Wrestling database
 Periodicals

1953 births
Living people
American male sport wrestlers
American sambo practitioners
Medalists at the 1984 Summer Olympics
Olympic silver medalists for the United States in wrestling
Oregon Ducks wrestlers
Pan American Games gold medalists for the United States
Pan American Games medalists in wrestling
Sportspeople from Virginia
United States Marines
World Wrestling Championships medalists
Wrestlers at the 1984 Summer Olympics
Wrestlers at the 1983 Pan American Games
Medalists at the 1983 Pan American Games
People from Redding, California
Sportspeople from California
20th-century American people
21st-century American people